Douglas James Rain (March 13, 1928 – November 11, 2018) was a Canadian actor and narrator. Although primarily a stage actor, he is perhaps best known for his voicing of the HAL 9000 computer in the film 2001: A Space Odyssey (1968) and its sequel 2010: The Year We Make Contact (1984).

Early life 
Rain was born in Winnipeg, Manitoba, the son of Mary, a nurse, and James Rain, a rail yard switchman, both from Glasgow, Scotland.

Career 
Rain graduated with a B.A. from the University of Manitoba in 1950, then studied acting at the Banff School of Fine Arts in Banff, Alberta and the Bristol Old Vic Theatre School in Bristol, England. He was a founding member of the Stratford Festival of Canada in 1953 and was associated with it as an actor until 1998.

He performed a wide variety of theatrical roles, such as a production of Henry V staged in Stratford, Ontario, that was adapted for television in 1966. In 1972, he was nominated for the Tony Award for Best Supporting or Featured Actor (Dramatic) for his performance in Vivat! Vivat Regina!

Voice of the HAL 9000 computer 
Stanley Kubrick cast Rain as the voice of the HAL 9000 computer for the film 2001: A Space Odyssey (1968) after hearing his narration of a short documentary titled Universe and later chose him as "the creepy voice of HAL". In the film, his voice was also sometimes processed with an electronic device called the Eltro information rate changer.

Rain reprised the role for the sequel 2010: The Year We Make Contact (1984). He also briefly parodied it in Woody Allen's film Sleeper, and in a sketch on Second City Television where Merv Griffin (played by Rick Moranis) takes his eponymous talk show into outer space.

Death 
Rain died on November 11, 2018, at the age of 90 at St. Mary's Memorial Hospital in St. Marys, Ontario of natural causes. He was married twice and had three children and a grandchild.

Filmography 
Oedipus Rex (1957) — Messenger
Just Mary (1960, TV series) — voice
The Night They Killed Joe Howe (1960, TV drama, co-starring Austin Willis and James Doohan) — Joseph Howe
Universe (1960, short film) — Narrator
One Plus One (1961) — segment "The Divorcee"
William Lyon Mackenzie: A Friend to His Country (1961, short) — William Lyon Mackenzie
Robert Baldwin: A Matter of Principle (1961, short) — William Lyon Mackenzie
The Other Man (1963, TV miniseries) — David Henderson
Twelfth Night (1964, TV movie)
Fields of Sacrifice (1964) — Narrator
Henry V (1966, TV movie) — Henry V
2001: A Space Odyssey (1968) — voice of HAL 9000
Talking to a Stranger (1971, TV miniseries) — Alan
Sleeper (1973) — voice of Evil Computer / Various Robot Butlers
The Russian-German War (1973, documentary) — Narrator
The Man Who Skied Down Everest (1974) — Narrator
One Canadian: The Political Memoirs of the Rt. Hon. John G. Diefenbaker (1976, TV miniseries, voice)
SCTV (1982, "The Merv Griffin Show") — voice of HAL 9000
2010: The Year We Make Contact (1984) — voice of HAL 9000
Love and Larceny (1985, TV movie) — Ashton Fletcher

References

External links 

1928 births
2018 deaths
20th-century Canadian male actors
Male actors from Winnipeg
Canadian people of Scottish descent
University of Manitoba alumni
Alumni of Bristol Old Vic Theatre School
Canadian male film actors
Canadian male stage actors
Canadian male television actors
Canadian male voice actors
Dora Mavor Moore Award winners
Canadian male Shakespearean actors